Yendada is a neighbourhood situated on Visakhapatnam and Madhurawada road.

About
Yendada Is Developing Very Rapidly and 
Having Extremely High Real Estate Boom.

Transport
APSRTC routes

Gallery

References

Neighbourhoods in Visakhapatnam